Conjugata elegans is a species of green algae in the family Zygnemataceae. The name was regarded as "provisional" by AlgaeBase as of 13 March 2006. The genus Conjugata may be a synonym of Spirogyra.

References

External links 
 
 
 
 Conjugata elegans at AlgaeBase (unchecked)
 Conjugata elegans at gbif (unchecked)
 Conjugata elegans at the International Register of Marine and Nonmarine Genera (accepted)

Zygnemataceae